Gretchen C. Morgenson (born January 2, 1956)  is an  American, Pulitzer Prize-winning journalist notable as longtime writer of the Market Watch column for the Sunday "Money & Business" section of The New York Times. In November, 2017, she moved from the Times to The Wall Street Journal.

Early life and education
Morgenson was born January 2, 1956, in State College, Pennsylvania. She graduated in 1976 from St. Olaf College in Northfield, Minnesota with a B.A. degree in English and History.

Career
She worked as an assistant editor with Vogue magazine, eventually becoming a writer and financial columnist. In 1981 she co-authored the book The Woman's Guide to the Stock Market and that same year joined the Wall Street stockbrokerage, Dean Witter Reynolds where she remained until January 1984. She returned to writing on financial matters at Money magazine and in late 1986 accepted an offer from Forbes magazine to work as an editor and an investigative business writer. In mid-1993, she left Forbes magazine to become the executive editor at Worth magazine but in September 1995 took on the job of press secretary for the Presidential election campaign of  Steve Forbes following which she was appointed assistant managing editor at Forbes magazine.

The New York Times
In May 1998, Morgenson became the assistant business and financial editor at The New York Times. She has written about the conflicts of interests between financial analysts and their employers who generate income money from the companies that the analysts assess.

Beginning in 2005, Morgenson has been focusing on executive compensation packages being paid by American companies that she asserts have reached levels far in excess of what can be justified to shareholders.

In 2006, Morgenson broke a story about a Wall Street analyst (Matthew Murray) who was fired shortly after he reported emails to Congress concerning potential violations of SEC regulation AC by the investment bank (Rodman & Renshaw) that he worked for at the time. The emails allegedly documented that the investment bank wouldn't let the analyst lower his rating, or have his name removed from coverage, of an investment banking client. A subsequent article by Morgenson highlighted a letter she obtained from the Senate Finance Committee in which Senator Grassley stated that the investment bank's chairman (General Wesley Clark) had acknowledged to his staff that the analyst had been fired from the investment bank as a result of reporting the emails to Congress. Rodman was subsequently fined $315,000 for “supervisory and other violations related to the interaction between the firm’s research and investment banking functions.”

In 2009, The Nation called Morgenson "The Most Important Financial Journalist of Her Generation". In 2002 she won the Pulitzer Prize  for her "trenchant and incisive" coverage of Wall Street. She has appeared on Bill Moyers Journal, and Charlie Rose.

The Wall Street Journal
In November, 2017, Wall Street Journal investigations editor Michael Siconolfi announced that Morgenson was joining the paper's investigative team as a senior special writer, working closely also with reporters in the money and investing group and the financial enterprise group.

Personal life
She is married, has a son and lives in New York City.

Awards
 2009 Gerald Loeb Award for Beat Writing for "Wall Street"
 2009 Gerld Loeb Award for Large Newspapers for "The Reckoning"
 2003 Matrix Awards Hall of Fame Newspapers 
 2002 Pulitzer Prize for Beat Reporting "for her trenchant and incisive Wall Street coverage."
 2002 Gerald Loeb Award for Commentary

Bibliography
The Woman's Guide to the Stock Market, Barbara Lee, Gretchen Morgenson, Harmony Books, 1982, 
Forbes Great Minds Of Business, John Wiley, 1997, 
The Capitalist's Bible: The Essential Guide to Free Markets—And Why They Matter to You, HarperCollins, 2009 
Reckless Endangerment: How Outsized Ambition, Greed, and Corruption Led to Economic Armageddon, with Joshua Rosner, Times Books, 2011,

References

External links

C-SPAN Q&A interview with Morgenson, July 1, 2012
Morgenson's Pulitzer Prize entry

"Audit Interview: Gretchen Morgenson", Columbia Journalism Review, Ryan Chittum, January 9, 2009

1956 births
Living people
American columnists
American finance and investment writers
Gerald Loeb Award winners for Large Newspapers
Gerald Loeb Award winners for Columns, Commentary, and Editorials
Gerald Loeb Award winners for Deadline and Beat Reporting
People from State College, Pennsylvania
Pulitzer Prize for Beat Reporting winners
St. Olaf College alumni
Stockbrokers
The New York Times columnists
American women columnists
Writers from Pennsylvania
20th-century American journalists
20th-century American women writers
21st-century American journalists
21st-century American women writers